Huhn-Harrison House is a historic home located at Cape Girardeau, Missouri.  It was built in 1905–1906, and is a -story, free classic Queen Anne style brick dwelling.  It features a wrap-around porch with classical columns for porch supports and a rounded corner.

It was listed on the National Register of Historic Places in 2002. It is located in the Courthouse-Seminary Neighborhood Historic District.

References

Individually listed contributing properties to historic districts on the National Register in Missouri
Houses on the National Register of Historic Places in Missouri
Queen Anne architecture in Missouri
Houses completed in 1906
Houses in Cape Girardeau County, Missouri
National Register of Historic Places in Cape Girardeau County, Missouri
1906 establishments in Missouri